Grace Eleanor Hadow OBE (9 December 1875 in Cirencester, England – 19 January 1940, Marylebone, London) was an author, principal of what would become St Anne's College, Oxford and vice-chairman of the National Federation of Women's Institutes (NFWI).

Life
Hadow was born in 1875 at South Cerney vicarage, near Cirencester. She was the youngest child and fourth daughter of the Reverend William Elliott Hadow and Mary Lang née Cornish. Her godfather was Sir William Henry Hadow who was also her elder brother.
In 1888, aged 13, Hadow won a scholarship to study at Brownshill Court School, Stroud. From the age of 16 she attended Truro High School. In 1894, she went to Trier in Germany for a year to study language and music. From 1899 to 1900, she taught at Cheltenham Ladies' College. In 1900, she began to study English at Somerville College, Oxford, but as a woman she was not allowed to receive a degree, although she could sit exams and took first-class honours in 1903. While a student, she became president of the Women's Debating Society.

In 1903, Hadow went to teach at Bryn Mawr in the United States. She returned to Oxford in 1904 to work as a don, becoming a tutor at Lady Margaret Hall in 1908. That year she published The Oxford Treasury of English Literature: Growth of the drama, which would grow to three volumes. Her other publications included a selection of the works of John Dryden (1908) and editions of Robert Browning's Men and Women (1911) and Walter Raleigh's The Historie of the World (1917).

Hadow was a Suffragist and established the Cirencester Women's Suffrage Society. This was affiliated to Millicent Fawcett's  National Union of Women's Suffrage Societies and she was Honorary Secretary from 1911 to 1917. She was also the Secretary of the Cirencester branch of the Conservative and Unionist Women's Franchise Association.

During the First World War, she was a member of the War Agricultural Committee and founded the Gloucestershire Women's Institute (WI). In 1917 the National Federation of Women's Institutes was formed. On 16 October Lady Denman and Hadow were elected chair and vice-chair and Alice Williams was elected honorary secretary and treasurer. Hadow would remain vice-chair for the rest of her life.

From February 1917 she had responsibility for the health and welfare of women munitions workers at the Ministry of Munitions. There her work and ideas impressed Professor W. G. S. Adams and, late in 1918, he persuaded her to become Secretary of the recently founded Barnett House at Oxford. Together with Adams she started the Oxfordshire Rural Community Council and guided the movement that saw rural community councils established in many other counties. In this endeavour she worked closely with the National Council of Social Service, later becoming a member of its Executive Committee.

In 1921 she declined the position of Principal of Lady Margaret Hall in order to remain at Barnett House and work with Adams in implementing a Plunkett Foundation programme for the relief of rural disadvantage, and in the same year she wrote the first edition of the National Federation of Women's Institutes (NFWI) handbook. From 1929 to 1940, she was Principal of the Society of Oxford Home Students (later St Anne's College. During this period she lived at 7 Fyfield Road, Oxford, and is remembered there by an Oxfordshire Blue Plaque.

In 1938, she was the only British woman delegate at the British Commonwealth relations conference in Sydney, Australia, and then set out on a long speaking tour of the United States. She was said to be one of the best women speakers. She arrived back in the UK as the country prepared itself for war and in 1940 died from pneumonia at 11 Beaumont Street, Marylebone, London.

Publications
 Oxford Treasury of English Literature, edited with her brother, W. H. Hadow (3 vols, 1907–8)
 Ideals of Living (1911) Sidgwick & Jackson Ltd, England
 Clara Schumann: An Artist's Life (1913) translated and edited by Hadow from Berthold Litzmann's German original
 Chaucer and His Times (1914) Williams and Norgate, London
 Wayfaring in Olden Times (1928) Pamphlet published by the BBC, London

References

External links
 
 

1875 births
1940 deaths
People from Cirencester
People from Cotswold District

Alumni of Somerville College, Oxford
English women writers
English social workers
English mountain climbers
Bryn Mawr College faculty
Fellows of Somerville College, Oxford
Principals of St Anne's College, Oxford
Officers of the Order of the British Empire
Sportspeople from Gloucestershire
People from South Cerney
Burials in Oxfordshire
Deaths from pneumonia in England
Burials at Wolvercote Cemetery